Johan Georg Johansson (born April 23, 1961 in Stockholm) is a writer and musician (drums, guitar, bass, vocal). He is most famous for his time as songwriter and drummer for the Swedish punk-rock band KSMB.

Biography
In 2008, Johansson was awarded the Svenska Vispriset, an annual prize which is awarded to a person or organisation for developing and furthering the art of folk singing, by Riksförbundet Visan i Sverige.

He and his family moved from Hornsgatan to Hagsätra during his birth year. In 1970 he moved to Skärholmen in Stockholm.

Johan has one child named Frans, with the writer Nina Lekander.

Music
The first band Ingenting (means "nothing" in Swedish) was formed 1974 and played covers of song by bands like The Who and Iggy & the Stooges.

In 1977 the band Skärholmens Gymnasiums Punkensemble was formed, the band changed name and became later KSMB. Since the band was not so popular yet they played at the local clubs in Skärholmen, Stockholm in the beginning.

The same year which KSMB was split up (1982), Johansson together with Janne Borgh formed the new band Strindbergs'. Strindberg just played a couple of years until 1985. Johansson then started  up a band called John Lennon (which later changed its name to John Lenin, to get away from Yoko Ono's lawyers).

In the 1990 his music turned in a different direction; his sound became more like Cornelis Vreeswijk.

In 2006 a solo album came up 10 years after the last, the album came together with the book I stället för vykort. The record contained a live-show with old and new material.

Writing
Johansson has also published two books, the travel book I stället för vykort (2006) and Wild Cards (2008), a book on festivals, and especially Storsjöyran.

Discography
KSMB
1980 - "Bakverk 80"
1980 - "Aktion"
1981 - "Rika Barn Leka Bäst"
1982 - "Dé É Förmycké" (live)

Strindbergs
1983 - "Bibeln"
1984 - "Med Strindbergs Ur Tiden"
1984 - "Bombpartyt"

John Lenin
1987 - "Peace For Presidents"

Johan Johansson
1993 - Flum
1994 - 10 (EP)
1996 - ...och hans lilla svarta värld
2001 - Sånger ur Trähatten 1982-2000
2006 - Ett kompledigt liv (Livealbum)
2008 - Vän av ordning (EP)
2011 - "Svea Rike Rivjärn"

References

External links
Johan Johansson's website

1961 births
Living people
Swedish male musicians